Murton could refer to:

Places
Murton, Cumbria, England
Murton, County Durham, England
Murton, Northumberland, England
Murton, North Yorkshire, England
Murton, Tyne and Wear, England
Murton, Swansea, Wales

People
Murton (surname)

See also
Merton (disambiguation)